The Heroes of Desert Storm is a 1991 film that told the story of the Persian Gulf War's Operation Desert Shield and Operation Desert Storm from the point of view of several participants.

Plot

On August 2, 1990, at dawn in Kuwait, a long succession of tanks and trucks drive toward and over the TV screen as opening credits roll, with contemporary radio news report playing.
 
Guy Hunter, Jr., Steven Shaefer, Steve Tate, Beverly Clark, Phoebe Jeter, Jonathan Alston, Ben Pennington, Mary Rhoads, Devon Jones and Lawrence Slade are introduced to the viewer, mostly in the context of family and friends back home, while Iraq invades Kuwait, Kuwaitis resist the invasion, Saddam Hussein takes foreign nationals in Iraq prisoner as human shields, the United States progressively increases its forces in and around Saudi Arabia, Army Reserve units become activated for Desert Shield, the United Nations sets a deadline for Iraq to withdraw from Kuwait, and finally, Saddam Hussein ignores that deadline up to the first commercial break. The activations mean that Ben Pennington does not get to tell his father and brother, who are off in the woods, goodbye, Phoebe Jeter does not get to see her ill grandmother for one last time, Daniel Maldonado misses the birth of his daughter, and one bride, Linda Buckholz, has to show her wedding to the guests on video. 
 
The viewer is treated to displays of American and coalition military deployment as contemporary radio news reports inform the viewer that the United Nations coalition has started to attack Iraq and occupied Kuwait as a prelude to liberating Kuwait. As Ben Pennington is deployed aboard an Air Force rescue helicopter, a hidden cameraman interviews him, and Ben replies that they are deliberately attracting Iraqi radar so AH-64 Apache helicopters can target the radars with anti-radiation missiles to clear a corridor for the bombers and simultaneously providing rescue cover in case a pilot is shot down and needs to be rescued by Ben and the crew on board.

The viewer gets to hear more news reports about infrared and night vision technology and laser-guided missiles fired from planes including the F-117 Nighthawk while a Nighthawk is displayed and gun camera footage shows various targets being destroyed in a sterile, precise fashion. Another news report mentions the role played by the Navy battleships Wisconsin and Missouri while they are shown firing their  guns onto Iraqi coastal targets. After Navy Corpsman Julian Crumes (played by Tim Russ) and Marine Gunnery Sergeant Leroy Ford (played by Ken Foree) are interviewed by another hidden cameraman about what they think about the bombing, CNN footage of Baghdad being bombed is shown while a reporter is giving his impression of it. For a finale before the second commercial break, Steve Tate intercepts and destroys an Iraqi aircraft.

Despite the cheers of his mates at King Abdul Aziz air base, Tate does not enjoy having the first air-to-air kill of the war because "a person died in that aircraft."  As General Chuck Horner was interviewed, "I've met Iraqi pilots, and they're good..." but attributed their weaknesses to Iraqi command and control, when, once it and the radars were defeated, made the Iraqis easier to shoot down. 
 
Back home in Pennsylvania, Beverly Clark is dismayed to be activated and deployed, and shares her doubts about coming home alive with her mother. Several starving and frightened Iraqi soldiers, waving white flags and approaching the border, surrender to Crumes' and Ford's Marine squad, and cringe when the Marines fire a warning shot. The prisoners are given food and medical attention as required under the Geneva Convention. In contrast, Iraq's treatment of coalition prisoners such as British Tornado pilot John Peters is shown as Iraq depicted to the news media, and new prisoner Guy Hunter is tortured under interrogation and also shown to the news media while his daughter and wife back home watch in anguish. The F-14 Devon Jones is flying is hit by a surface-to-air missile despite attempts to evade it, and both are forced to eject before the jet is engulfed in flame.
 
Devon Jones lands in Iraq before dawn and activates his emergency transmitter. Soon Ben Pennington is out looking for him. But the Iraqis are also homing in on the rescue signal. Devon notices a truck, and then notices the Air Force helicopter. The helicopter notices the vehicle, and Devon indicates it might be a military vehicle. At least one AH-64 Apache is covering the rescue, and fires Hellfire missiles on the truck. Ben expertly disembarks from the helicopter, rifle drawn, and quickly finds Devon, does a "fireman's carry" for him, runs to the MH-53J helicopter, hands over his rifle, hands over Devon, and quickly secures Devon for liftoff while gunners watch for the enemy. Not a second after Devon is secured when the helicopter lifts off, "inbound" with "survivor on board". Devon demands to know about his backseater, Larry. Ben replies that they will know when they return to base. Indeed, Larry was captured.

Crumes and Ford are enjoying some bottled water when the Battle of Khafji begins and a unit needs a Corpsman. Crumes is able to save one soldier's life, but reflects to Ford on the terror of war and asks if Vietnam was as bad. Ford replies that the all-volunteer U.S. military in Iraq is better trained than the U.S. military in Vietnam, but adds that the Marines will still go in first, this time like the last. 
 
After another news report and video of Scuds falling on Israel, which although attacked, must remain neutral for the sake of maintaining the international coalition including Egypt and Syria, the Patriot anti-missile system is introduced. Phoebe Jeter's battery saves Gary Buckholz's base. Meanwhile, Beverly Clark and Mary Rhoads are at a processing center for incoming U.S. soldiers, in Dhahran, which will later be hit by a Scud. Meanwhile, Private Steven Shaefer has volunteered for Desert Storm duty, and quickly upon arriving in Kuwait meets Specialist Jonathan Alston. When an explosion is heard in the distance, Alston knows that Shaefer is inexperienced in combat, and questions him about his training. Sure enough, Steven has not been prepped on chemical, biological, radiological, or nuclear warfare or even on land mines, merely his basic training. When Jonathan demands to know how the Army messed up sending him into danger, Steven drops his bombshell. Alston is impressed and says they will win medals like Alston's uncles did in the Second World War.
 
The ground war starts. Marine Captain Michael Shupp (played by Kevin Kilner) instructs Ford and Crumes' unit to fight professionally to keep one another safe, but to reserve compassion for Saddam's draftees deliberately sacrificed by Saddam to keep his Republican Guard in reserve, and promises them that they will all make it through and go home. Precision weapons save their unit when the enemy is "danger close". Shupp orders his men only to fire in self-defense after the enemy surrenders. Indeed, another news reporter voices over video of long lines of Iraqi prisoners of war who had been forced to fight with death squads and land mines to prevent desertion.
 
Guy Hunter, Jr., gets tortured again after a coalition strike that scares him, and probably did more than scare his captors. Threatened with execution and blindfolded, Hunter shows no fear, and says "just do it."
 
Meanwhile, Beverly Clark is winning at trivia, but pauses long enough to get a soda and chat with her best friend Mary Rhoads. Beverly tells Mary she has come to peace about being deployed in a danger zone, and Mary invites Beverly to join her for fresh air, though Beverly declines. Suddenly there is a Scud alarm. Mary starts putting on chemical warfare gear, and Beverly instructs others to do the same. However, the Patriot is not successful in annihilating the Scud, and Mary watches in horror as Beverly and her comrades are hit by the incoming warhead. Another news reporter voice-over with video of the aftermath.
 
It is not long before the Clarks in Pennsylvania are summoned to Army Reserve headquarters, where a tactful notification of families is under way, but taking too long for the Clark parents. Beverly's mother found out what her husband, weeping in the senior officer's office, already heard from him, and despite her initial denial, she understands the truth.
 
Alston and Shaefer get their medals when they volunteer to kill an Iraqi suicide squad ready to detonate an ammunition dump in the way of U.S. forces in Objective Utah, western Kuwait, and overcome various dangers including land mines and trip wires. Shaefer distracts the squad with his M-16 while Alston, above the trench, tosses in a hand grenade. 
 
The Basra-Kuwait "Highway of Death" is depicted next with more videos and voice-overs, indicating that the intent is not to destroy, but to disable the Iraqi retreat. Nevertheless, in contrast to the funeral of Beverly Clark in Pennsylvania, a significant amount of death exists on the Highway for a U.S. Army chaplain, announced by the newscaster as a rabbi, to provide appropriate Muslim rights for.  
 
By now, Hunter has been reunited with other American POWs, including Larry Slade: when one hugs Hunter, it is evident the Iraqis broke his ribs. When the Iraqis come back, they come back with cheap perfume. Hunter challenges the captors, and enraged, one threatens to shoot him, but Hunter is not going to give them the satisfaction of showing fear this time either. He replies, "God bless America."
 
The U.S. troops return home to widespread jubilation, including one Linda Buckholz in her wedding gown. The celebration contrasts with Phoebe Jeter at the grave site of her grandmother.

Finally, President George Herbert Walker Bush gives an address celebrating the defeat of aggression and the restoration of Kuwait to its people.

Characters
 Steven Shaefer, an Army recruit from Wilmington, Delaware, who later as a new private at a U.S. base in Helbronn, Germany, volunteers for Desert Storm duty, played by Kris Kamm.
 Army Specialist Jonathan "Big" "Big John" Alston, who meets the eager but inexperienced Steven Schaefer in Kuwait and takes him under his wing, played by Steven Williams.
 Specialist Beverly Clark, an Army reservist in Armagh, Pennsylvania, assigned to a quartermasters unit, played by Laura Leigh Hughes.
 Chief Warrant Officer Guy Hunter, Jr., a Marine ground support aviator, who, at the start of the movie, recently transferred with his family to Camp Pendleton, California, played by Michael Champion.
 Steve Tate, an Air Force F-15 pilot in Langley AFB, Virginia, played by Gary Hershberger.
 Lt. Phoebe Jeter, an Army Patriot missile Platoon Leader (Fire Control) for Delta Battery 3/43 ADA assigned to Fort Bliss, Texas, played by Angela Bassett.
 Sergeant Benjamin Pennington, in search and rescue, assigned to Dover AFB, Delaware, played by Daniel Baldwin.
 Daniel Maldonado, "a printer on a carrier", actor unknown.
 Gary Buckholz, an Air Force Technician, played by William Bumiller.
 Devon Jones, a Navy F-14 pilot, played by Michael Allen Brooks, assigned to the carrier , and his radar intercept officer, Lawrence "Larry" Slade.

Interviews
 Sgt. Benjamin Pennington, discussing what it was like to save Devon Jones.
 Lt. Phoebe Jeter, discussing the death of her grandmother while deployed.
 Yolanda (played by Maria Diaz) Maldonado, discussing how their son, mistakenly, believed Daniel Maldonado has been killed, and also how a young boy is unable to handle the uncertainty of a parent coming home from war; and Daniel Maldonado, discussing the birth of their daughter while he was deployed.
 Linda Buckholz, married to Gary Buckholz almost immediately before his deployment, on the importance of not missing a call from a service member when the service member is able to make a call, before the widespread use of the cell phone.
 Mary Hunter, Guy Hunter's wife, discussing her reaction to the news of his downing and probable capture.
 Army Lieutenant Colonel Walter Wodjakowski, played by Marshall Bell, says although the fighting might have looked easy to a civilian back home, it was not; Iraq had a large, battle hardened, and well trained army, and even though technology can help win a war, in many cases, such as in the trenches, technology cannot substitute for an infantryman, a "ground pounder". 
 Sergeant Mary Rhoads (played by Jocelyn O'Brien), on Scud strike killing her close friend Beverly Clark.
 Sgt. David Occhiuzzo, Air Force Special Operations Command, GMF Satcom Ranger, Tactical Air Control Party (ROMAD)

Differences from Reader's Digest news account of the rescue of Devon Jones 

The two aircraft used to protect the MH-53J helicopter rescuing Devon Jones were actually A-10 Warthogs, not an AH-64 Apache helicopter gunship. Ben Pennington is the rescuer's real name.

References

External links

Yahoo TV  
Watch The Heroes of Desert Storm for free

1991 films
American documentary films
Films set in Iraq
Films set in Kuwait
Gulf War films
Documentary films about war
War films based on actual events
Films scored by Sylvester Levay
1990s American films